Hamid Kazemi is an Iranian footballer who currently plays for Baadraan in Azadegan League.

Club career
Kazemi joined Pas Hamedan in 2010 after spending the previous season at Mehrkam Pars F.C. in the Azadegan League.

 Assists

Honors

Individual
2019–20 Azadegan League Top Scorer

References

Iranian footballers
Paykan F.C. players
Sanat Mes Kerman F.C. players
Steel Azin F.C. players
PAS Hamedan F.C. players
Shirin Faraz Kermanshah players
Living people
1988 births
Association football forwards
21st-century Iranian people